Baskil District is a district of Elazığ Province of Turkey. Its seat is the town Baskil. Its area is 1,318 km2, and its population is 12,100 (2021).

Composition
There is 1 municipality in Baskil District:
Baskil

There are 60 villages in Baskil District:

 Akdemir
 Akuşağı
 Aladikme
 Alangören
 Altınuşağı
 Aşağıkuluşağı
 Beşbölük
 Bilaluşağı
 Bozoğlak
 Çavuşlu
 Çiğdemlik
 Deliktaş
 Demirlibahçe
 Doğancık
 Düğüntepe
 Emirhan
 Eskiköy
 Gemici
 Habibuşağı
 Hacıhüseyinler
 Hacımehmetli
 Hacımustafaköy
 Hacıuşağı
 Harabekayış
 Hüyükköy
 Işıklar
 İçlikaval
 İmikuşağı
 Kadıköy
 Karaali
 Karagedik
 Karakaş
 Karoğlu
 Kayabeyli
 Kızıluşağı
 Koçyolu
 Konacık
 Konalga
 Kumlutarla
 Kuşsarayı
 Kutlugün
 Meydancık
 Paşakonağı
 Pınarlı
 Resulkahya
 Sarıtaş
 Söğütdere
 Suyatağı
 Şahaplı
 Şahindere
 Şeyh Hasan
 Şituşağı
 Tatlıpayam
 Tavşanuşağı
 Topaluşağı
 Yalındam
 Yaylanlı
 Yeniocak
 Yıldızlı
 Yukarıkuluşağı

References

Districts of Elazığ Province